Church of the Nativity of the Theotokos in Srijemske Laze is a Serbian Orthodox church in Vukovar-Syrmia County in eastern Croatia. Church is dedicated to Nativity of the Theotokos and was built in 1793. The building is listed in Register of Cultural Goods of Croatia.
During the history building was renewed three times, in 1792, 1925 and 2003. Iconostasis with 21 icon was built in 1926. During World War II and Independent State of Croatia church movable property was taken away, and church was converted into Roman Catholic one.

See also
Eparchy of Osječko polje and Baranja
Srijemske Laze
Serbs of Croatia
List of Serbian Orthodox churches in Croatia

References

Churches completed in 1793
18th-century Serbian Orthodox church buildings
Srijemske Laze
Register of Cultural Goods of the Republic of Croatia
Anti-Serbian sentiment
1793 establishments in Europe